Arch of Triumph is a 1945 novel by Erich Maria Remarque about stateless refugees in Paris before World War II. Written during his exile in the United States (1939–1948), it was his second worldwide bestseller, after All Quiet on the Western Front. It was made into a feature film starring Ingrid Bergman and Charles Boyer in 1948 and into a television film starring Anthony Hopkins and Lesley-Anne Down in 1984.

Plot
The novel is set in Paris, in 1939. Despite having no permission to perform surgery, stateless refugee Ravic, a very accomplished German surgeon, has been “ghost-operating” on patients for two years on the behalf of two less-skillful French physicians.

Unwilling to return to Nazi Germany, which has stripped him of his citizenship, and unable to  exist legally anywhere else in pre-war western Europe, Ravic manages to hang on. He is one of many displaced persons, without passports or any other documents, who live under a constant threat of being captured and deported from one country to the next, and back again.

Ravic has given up on the possibility of love, but life has a curious way of taking a turn for the romantic, even during the worst of times.

Main characters
 Ravic – a refugee surgeon from Germany who has no citizenship (his real name is Ludwig Fresenburg)
 Joan Madou – actress, singer. Her father is Romanian, her mother is Italian. She spent her childhood in Italy.
 Haake – a German Gestapo man who tortured Ravic and committed his beloved girl Sibylla to suicide. Killed by Ravic at the end of the novel.
 Veber – a gynecologist from the Durand Clinic, Comrade Ravic; a family man, who loves to care for his own garden.
 Durant – the famous doctor, the owner of the clinic. A good diagnostician but a poor surgeon, he hires other doctors who operate on patients instead of him.
 Kate Hegstrom – an American, Ravic's first patient, sick with cancer. Returned to the U.S. on the SS Normandie.
 Boris Morosow – a tall and strong 60-year-old bearded man, an émigré from Russia; there is a porter at the Scheherazade establishment. Dreams of revenge against the communists who tortured his father.
 Aaron Goldberg – Ravich's neighbor at the 'Internationale' Hotel, hanged himself at the window
 Ruth Goldberg – the wife of Aaron Goldberg. After the death of her husband, she sold his passport to another illegal immigrant.
 Ernst Zeylenbaum – Doctor of Philology and Philosophy, an illegal migrant, lived for six years at the 'Internationale'.
 Rosenfeld – an emigrant who sells unique paintings (Van Gogh, Cézanne, Gauguin, Sisley, Renoir, Delacroix) to survive
 Jeannot – a 13-year-old boy who got into an accident. Ravic amputated his leg.
 Lucienne – unsuccessfully performed an abortion with a non-professional midwife, and then went to the clinic, where she was operated on by Ravic. After the removal of the uterus, she continued to earn by prostitution.
 Rolande – a brothel manager, acquaintance of Ravic since he comes to give examinations to the prostitutes in his capacity as doctor

Relationship to other works
Remarque's earlier novel, Flotsam, is also about the lives of stateless individuals. The character Ravic makes brief appearances in three of Remarque's other novels: Shadows in Paradise, The Promised Land and Game.

References

1945 German novels
Novels by Erich Maria Remarque
Novels set in Paris
Fiction set in 1939
Appleton-Century books
German novels adapted into films
German novels adapted into television shows
Works about illegal immigration
Refugees and displaced people in fiction